Since August 20, 2007, at least 20 detached human feet have been found on the coasts of the Salish Sea in British Columbia, Canada, and Washington, US. The first discovery, on August 20, 2007, was on Jedediah Island in British Columbia. Feet have been discovered on the coasts of islands in British Columbia, and in the US cities of Tacoma and Seattle.

In Canada, the B.C. Coroners Service said in December 2017 that foul play had been ruled out by authorities in all investigations and that the feet came from people who died either in accidents or by suicide, and the feet detached during the normal decomposition process. The feet were usually found in sneakers, which the coroner thought were responsible for both keeping the feet buoyant enough to eventually wash ashore, and for giving the feet enough protection from decomposition to be found relatively intact. Prior to the recent seeming rush of feet washing ashore, there have been earlier instances going back more than a century, such as a leg in a boot that was found on a Vancouver beach in 1887. The most recent discovery was on January 1, 2019, when people on Jetty Island in Everett, Washington called police to report a boot with a human foot inside, which the coroner was able to match to Antonio Neill, who was missing since December 12, 2016.

Discoveries
These foot discoveries are not the first ones on British Columbia's coast. One was found in Vancouver in 1887, leading to the place of discovery being called Leg-In-Boot Square. On July 30, 1914, The Vancouver Sun reported that recent arrivals from Kimsquit reported a human leg encased in a high boot was found on a beach near the mouth of the Salmon River (a previous name for the Dean River near Kimsquit, near the headwaters of Dean Channel). It was thought the remains were from a man who had drowned on the river the previous summer.

As of September 2018, 15 feet have been found in the Canadian province of British Columbia between 2007 and 2018, and five in the US state of Washington. The feet include a number of matched pairs.

In British Columbia, 13 of the 15 feet have been identified; the latest was a left foot found on the shore of a rocky beach in West Vancouver, B.C., in September 2018 and through DNA analysis linked to a male that went missing earlier that year. The two unidentified feet found in February 2016 washed up on the shore of Botanical Beach on the West coast of Vancouver Island (adjacent to the Strait of Juan de Fuca).

In the U.S., one of these pairs belonged to a woman who jumped from a bridge. Of the two other U.S. feet identified, one foot belonged to a missing fisherman and the other of a depressed man who probably committed suicide. His identity was withheld on request of his family.

After the fifth foot was discovered of the 20, the story had begun to receive increased international media attention. With major headlines from newspapers such as the Melbourne Herald Sun, The Guardian, and the Cape Times in South Africa, the story elicited much speculation about the cause of the mystery, originating from "morbid fascination" with this type of subject, as stated by one scientist who identifies remains of victims. On his late night talk show David Letterman questioned two Canadian audience members about the mystery.

Another apparently human foot, discovered on June 18, 2008, on Tyee Spit near Campbell River on Vancouver Island, was a hoax. The hoax was a "skeletonized animal paw" which was put in a sock and shoe and then stuffed with dried seaweed. Royal Canadian Mounted Police launched an investigation.

After the 11th foot was found on August 31, 2011, in Vancouver, several running shoes containing what police suspected was raw meat were found washed up on Oak Beach, British Columbia.

List of discoveries

Level of rarity
Decomposition may separate the foot from the body because the ankle is relatively weak, while buoyancy caused by air either inside or trapped within a shoe would allow it to float away. According to Simon Fraser University entomologist Gail Anderson, extremities such as the hands, feet, and head often detach as a body decomposes in water but rarely float.

However, finding feet and not the rest of the bodies has been deemed unusual. Finding two feet has been guessed at "million to one odds" and has thus been referred to as "an anomaly" by one police officer.   The finding of the third foot made it the first time a police officer interviewed knew about that three such discoveries had been made so close to each other.

In popular culture
In his novel, Dregs (2011), the Norwegian award-winning author Jørn Lier Horst gives a fictional explanation for the foot findings.

The 2020 novel Crooked River by Douglas Preston and Lincoln Child begins with severed feet found on a beach inspired by this event.

The episode "The Feet on the Beach" of the American crime-procedural comedy-drama Bones aired April 7, 2011, where eight pairs of dismembered feet were discovered on the U.S.-Canada border.

Popular podcast Stuff You Should Know (also known as SYSK) had an episode about the disembodied feet specifically in British Columbia. It was released June 14, 2016.

See also
 List of unsolved deaths

Notes

Further reading
 
 
 
 
 

2007 in British Columbia
2008 in British Columbia
2009 in British Columbia
2010 in British Columbia
2011 in British Columbia
2012 in British Columbia
2008 in Washington (state)
2010 in Washington (state)
2011 in Washington (state)
2014 in Washington (state)
Foot
Unsolved deaths